In August 2012, the UK television network ITV announced that the series Law & Order: UK would return with a six-episode seventh series with production to begin in November. It was also announced that cast members Freema Agyeman and Harriet Walter would not be returning. Georgia Taylor and Paterson Joseph join the cast in this series. The series began airing on 14 July 2013, eighteen months since the airing of Series 6.

Cast

Main

Law
 Bradley Walsh as Senior Detective Sergeant Ronnie Brooks
 Paul Nicholls as Junior Detective Sergeant Sam Casey
 Paterson Joseph as Detective Inspector Wes Leyton

Order
 Dominic Rowan as Senior Crown Prosecutor Jacob Thorne
 Georgia Taylor as Junior Crown Prosecutor Kate Barker
 Peter Davison as Henry Sharpe, Director of London Crown Prosecution Service

Episodes

1 Ratings do not include ITV HD.

References

Law & Order: UK
2013 British television seasons